Gamblesby is a village near Melmerby, in the civil parish of Glassonby, Cumbria, England. It appears first in written records in 1177 as Gamelesbi, and in 1212 as Gamelesby. Originally a township of the ancient parish of Addingham, Gamblesby was a civil parish in its own right from 1866 until 1934. In 1931 the parish had a population of 197.

The village's former church, St. John's, is now a private house.

There are several large houses, also there are others that are smaller but all with gardens. Plenty of land surrounds the area which supports either livestock or crops for farming. The village has a road passing through which leads to Unthank, Glassonby and Melmerby.

See also

Listed buildings in Glassonby

References

External links
 Cumbria County History Trust: Gamblesby (nb: provisional research only – see Talk page)

Villages in Cumbria
Former civil parishes in Cumbria
Glassonby